Nils Petter Molvær also known as NPM (born 18 September 1960) is a Norwegian jazz trumpeter, composer, and record producer. He is considered a pioneer of future jazz, a genre that fuses jazz and electronic music, best showcased on his most commercially successful album, Khmer.

Biography
Molvær was born and raised on the island of Sula, Møre og Romsdal, Norway, and left at age nineteen to study on the Jazz program at Trondheim Musikkonservatorium (1980–82). He joined the bands Jazzpunkensemblet with Jon Eberson and Masqualero, alongside Arild Andersen, Jon Christensen and Tore Brunborg. Masqualero (named after a Wayne Shorter composition originally recorded by Miles Davis) recorded several albums for ECM Records, and Molvær recorded with other ECM artists before his 1997 debut solo album, Khmer. The record was a fusion of jazz, rock, electronic soundscapes, and hip-hop beats – and quite unlike the delicate "chamber jazz" typically associated with ECM.  Molvær's muted trumpet sound, sometimes electronically processed, had an obvious debt to Miles Davis's work of the 1970s and 1980s, but without being a slavish copy.  For the first time, ECM released singles: "Song of Sand", backed with three remixes, and "Ligotage". In 2000, a second album followed, Solid Ether, after which Molvær left ECM. He has recorded several albums since, and has also produced film and theater music.

He often works with guitarist Eivind Aarset. He has also played with Tabla Beat Science, created by Zakir Hussain and Bill Laswell.

Honors 
1996: Kongsberg Jazz Award
1997: Spellemannprisen in the Open class
1998: Gammleng-prisen in the class Jazz
1996: Kongsberg Jazz Award
2000: Spellemannprisen in the Open class
2003: Buddyprisen
2005: Spellemannprisen in the Open class

Discography

In Masqualero
 1983: Masqualero
 1985: Bande À Part
 1987: Aero
 1990: Re-Enter

Solo
 1997: Khmer
 1998: Khmer: The Remixes (promo only)
 1998: Ligotage (EP)
 2000: Solid Ether (feat. Sidsel Endresen and others)
 2001: Recoloured (remixes)
 2002: NP3
 2004: Streamer (2002, live)
 2005: Er 
 2005: Edy (soundtrack to the film by Guérin-Tillié)
 2005: Remakes (remixes)
 2005: An American Compilation (compilation)
 2008: Re-Vision (OST outtakes merged into an album) 
 2009: Hamada 
 2011: Baboon Moon
 2014: Switch
 2016: Buoyancy
 2021: Stitches

Collaborations
 1990: So I Write, with Sidsel Endresen, Django Bates, Jon Christensen
 1995: Hastening Westward, with Robyn Schulkowsky
 1997: Small Labyrinths (recorded 1994), in Marilyn Mazur's Future Song 
 2005: Electra, in Arild Andersen Group
 2008: Corps Electriques, with Hector Zazou/KatieJane Garside, Bill Rieflin, Lone Kent
 2013: 1/1, with Moritz von Oswald
 2015: Infolding, in Spin Marvel (Martin France - drums, Tim Harries - bass, Terje Evensen - live electronics, Nils Petter Molvaer - trumpet, Emre Ramazanoglu - production and further drums)
 2015: Høst: Autumn Fall (OST), with Mapping Oceans
 2018: Nordub, with Sly & Robbie
 2019: Music For Paintings, with Terje Evensen, Leo Abrahams, Anna Stereopoulou, Anthony Cox, Manongo Mujica

As featured artist
 1990: Nonsentration - Jon Balke
 1992: Night Caller - Rita Marcotulli
 1993: Exile - Sidsel Endresen
 1997: Brytningstid - Kenneth Sivertsen
 1998: Électronique Noire - Eivind Aarset
 2001: Radioaxiom – A Dub Transmission - Bill Laswell & Jah Wobble
 2003: Digital Prophecy - Dhafer Youssef
 2004: Seafarer's Song - Ketil Bjørnstad
 2006: Mélange Bleu - Lars Danielsson
 2007: A Pure Land - Sienná
 2007: Ataraxis - Deeyah
 2007: 23 Wheels of Dharma - Somma
 2008: Dome - Johannes Enders
 2008: Lodge - Fanu & Bill Laswell
 2012: Manu Katché - Manu Katché
 2015: Deeper Green - Christof May
 2017: Hypersomniac - Lef
 2019: Hyperuranion - Chat Noir
 2021: Roses of Neurosis - Sivert Høyem

Also appears on
Beginner's Guide to Scandinavia (3CD, Nascente 2011)

References

External links
 

 Nils Petter Molvær Biography by Johs Bergh on Store Norske Leksikon

Norwegian jazz composers
Male jazz composers
Jazz fusion musicians
Avant-garde jazz musicians
Spellemannprisen winners
20th-century Norwegian trumpeters
21st-century Norwegian trumpeters
Norwegian University of Science and Technology alumni
1960 births
Living people
Musicians from Langevåg
Norwegian jazz trumpeters
Male trumpeters
ECM Records artists
20th-century Norwegian male musicians
21st-century Norwegian male musicians
1300 Oslo members
Jazzpunkensemblet members
Masqualero members
Thirsty Ear Recordings artists